Tetranychoidea is a superfamily of mites in the order Trombidiformes. There are about 5 families and more than 2,200 described species in Tetranychoidea.

Families
These five families belong to the superfamily Tetranychoidea:
 Allochaetophoridae
 Linoteranidae
 Tenuipalpidae
 Tetranychidae (spider mites)
 Tuckerellidae

References

Further reading

 
 
 
 
 

Trombidiformes
Arachnid superfamilies